Reina Valdez (sometimes credited as Rena Valdez; born December 1890) was a silent film actress active in Hollywood in the 1910s.

Biography 
Although some publicity reports claimed she was born in and raised in Mexico, she was a native of Springfield, Massachusetts, where she grew up before she moved to New York City to pursue an interest in acting. After a few appearances on Broadway, eventually she found herself in Los Angeles, where she worked for a number of film companies over the course of her short career, including the Santa Barbara Motion Picture Company, the New York Motion Picture Company, and Essanay. Little is known about her life before or after her film career. It is likely that "Reina Valdez" was her stage name.

Selected filmography
 Mismated (1916)
 Good Out of Evil (1915)
 A Brother's Redemption (1915)
 The Woman He Married (1915)
 The Keeper of the Flock (1915)
 Beating Father to It (1915)
 The Call of the Sea (1915)
 The Boob's Racing Career (1915)
 Dan Cupid: Assayer (1914)
 The Atonement (1914)
 Single Handed (1914)
 The Conquest of Man (1914)
 The Arm of Vengeance (1914)
 Italian Love (1914)
 The Weaker's Strength (1914)
 A Gambler's Way (1914)
 A Night on the Road (1914)
 Through Trackless Sands (1914)
 The Trail of the Snake Band (1913)
 The Weaker Mind (1913)

References

American silent film actresses
20th-century American actresses
American film actresses

1890 births
Year of death missing
Actors from Springfield, Massachusetts